Jennifer Shannon "Jenna" Jacobson ( Insdahl; born 1982) is an American financial advisor and Democratic politician.  She is a member of the Wisconsin State Assembly, representing Wisconsin's 43rd Assembly district since January 2023.

Biography
Jenna Jacobson was born Jennifer Shannon Insdahl, was raised in Polk County, Wisconsin, and graduated from Frederic High School, in Frederic, Wisconsin, in 2000.  She attended University of Wisconsin–River Falls, but transferred to Purdue University, where she completed her bachelor's degree in consumer financial planning.  While attending school in River Falls, she worked as a teller at the WESTconsin Credit Union.  After transferring to Purdue, she worked for the Purdue Employees Federal Credit Union as a financial advisor. 

In 2013, she moved back to Wisconsin with her family and settled in the village of Oregon, Wisconsin, in southern Dane County.  She worked for several years as an analyst at the CUNA Mutual Group corporate headquarters and she is a long-time volunteer financial literacy coach.  But she currently identifies as a stay-at-home mom.

Political career 
In 2017, she ran for and was elected to the Oregon village board, and was re-elected in 2019.  Her term ended when she ran unsuccessfully for village president in 2021, but she was returned to the village board in the 2022 Spring election.

She has been active with the Oregon Housing Coalition, which seeks to bring affordable housing to Oregon, and, in early 2022, worked briefly for the Dane County government as a housing specialist.  She was also appointed to the Governor's Council on Financial Literacy and Capability.

The 2022 redistricting, carried out by the Wisconsin Supreme Court, moved incumbent representative Don Vruwink into the 33rd Assembly district, creating a vacancy in the 43rd district which he had represented since 2017.  Jacobson decided to enter the race for the Democratic nomination in the new 43rd district.  She soundly defeated former Edgerton, Wisconsin, mayor Matt McIntyre in the Democratic primary and went on to win the general election with 62% of the vote.

She will take office in January 2023.

Personal life and family
Jenna Insdahl took the name Jacobson when she married her husband, Kyle Jacobson.  The Jacobsons met when they were students at the University of Wisconsin–River Falls.  They live in Oregon, Wisconsin, with their three children.

Electoral history

Oregon Village President (2021)

| colspan="6" style="text-align:center;background-color: #e9e9e9;"| Nonpartisan Primary, February 16, 2021 (top two)

| colspan="6" style="text-align:center;background-color: #e9e9e9;"| General Election, April 6, 2021

Wisconsin Assembly (2022)

| colspan="6" style="text-align:center;background-color: #e9e9e9;"| Democratic Primary, August 9, 2022

| colspan="6" style="text-align:center;background-color: #e9e9e9;"| General Election, November 8, 2022

References

External links
 Campaign website
 
 Jenna Jacobson at Wisconsin Vote

1982 births
Living people
Democratic Party members of the Wisconsin State Assembly  
Women state legislators in Wisconsin
People from Polk County, Wisconsin
People from Oregon, Wisconsin
21st-century American women politicians
Purdue University alumni